Anastasia Vladimirovna Luppova (born 26 June 1985 in Kazan) is a Russian billiards player, the two-time European champion in Russian pyramid, the champion of Moscow in dynamic pyramid, and a Russian Master of Sports.

Luppova also won the 2009 Miss Billiards competition. She went on to become a coach.

References

External links 
 Фотоальбом Анастасии Лупповой
 Фан-сайт

Russian pool players
Female pool players
1985 births
Living people
Sportspeople from Kazan